Black Monday is a 1922 German silent film directed by Robert A. Dietrich and starring Erich Kaiser-Titz, Hella Moja and F.W. Schröder-Schrom.

Cast

References

External links

1922 films
Films of the Weimar Republic
German silent feature films
Films directed by Robert A. Dietrich
German black-and-white films
Terra Film films
1920s German films